The men's foil competition of the fencing events at the 2015 Pan American Games was held on July 22 at the Toronto Pan Am Sports Centre.

The foil competition consisted of a qualification round followed by a single-elimination bracket with a bronze medal match between the two semifinal losers. Fencing was done to 15 touches or to the completion of three three-minute rounds if neither fencer reached 15 touches by then. At the end of time, the higher-scoring fencer was the winner; a tie resulted in an additional one-minute sudden-death time period. This sudden-death period was further modified by the selection of a draw-winner beforehand; if neither fencer scored a touch during the minute, the predetermined draw-winner won the bout.

Schedule
All times are Eastern Daylight Time (UTC-4).

Results
The following are the results of the event.

Qualification
All 18 fencers were put into three groups of six athletes, were each fencer would have five individual matches. The top 16 athletes overall would qualify for next round.

Elimination round

References

Fencing at the 2015 Pan American Games